The first USS Essex of the United States Navy was a 36-gun  or 32-gun sailing frigate that participated in the Quasi-War with France, the First Barbary War, and in the War of 1812. The British captured her in 1814 and she then served as HMS Essex until sold at public auction on 6 June 1837.

Service history
The frigate was built by Enos Briggs, Salem, Massachusetts, at a cost of $139,362 subscribed by the people of Salem and Essex County, to a design by James Hackett. Essex was armed with mostly short-range carronades that could not hope to match the range of 18- and 24-pounder naval guns. She was launched on 30 September 1799. On 17 December 1799 she was presented to the United States Navy and accepted by Captain Edward Preble.

Shortly after commencement of her journey, Essex became the first US Naval ship to cross the Equator. Congress was dismasted only a few days out, and Essex was obliged to continue her voyage alone, making her mark as the first US man-of-war to double the Cape of Good Hope, both in March and in August 1800 prior to successfully completing her convoy mission in November.

First Barbary War
Captain William Bainbridge commanded Essex on her second cruise, whereon she sailed to the Mediterranean with the squadron of Commodore Richard Dale. Dispatched to protect American trade and seamen against depredations by the Barbary pirates, the squadron arrived at Gibraltar on 1 July 1801 and spent the ensuing year convoying American merchantmen and blockading Tripolitan ships in their ports. Following repairs at the Washington Navy Yard in 1802, Essex resumed her duties in the Mediterranean under Captain James Barron in August 1804. She participated in the Battle of Derne on 27 April 1805, and remained in those waters until the conclusion of peace terms in 1806.

Returning to the Washington Navy Yard in July, she was placed in ordinary until February 1809, when she was recommissioned for sporadic use in patrolling American waters and a single cruise to Europe.

War of 1812
When war was declared against Britain on 18 June 1812, Essex, commanded by Captain David Porter, made a successful cruise to the southward. On 11 July near Bermuda she fell in with seven British transports (Silverside being one) and by moonlight engaged and took one of them as a prize. On 13 August she encountered and captured the sloop  after an engagement. By September, when she returned to New York, Essex had taken ten prizes. The youngest member of the Essex crew was 10-year-old midshipman David Glasgow Farragut, who would become the first admiral of the US Navy. Farragut, who was Captain Porter's foster son, remained with the ship for the next two years.

Essex sailed in South Atlantic waters and along the coast of Brazil until January 1813. On 11 December 1812 she captured the Post Office Packet Service packet  as Nocton was returning to England from Rio de Janeiro. The Americans removed the specie that she was carrying (about £16,000) and some of her crew.

Essex then sailed to the Pacific where she decimated the British whaling fleet there. Although her crew suffered greatly from a shortage of provisions and heavy gales while rounding Cape Horn, she anchored safely at Valparaíso, Chile, on 14 March, having seized the whaling schooner Elizabeth, and the Peruvian man-of-war Nereyda along the way. Nereyda had captured two American whalers, Walker and Barclay, only to have the British whaler and privateer Nimrod take Walker. Nereyda had sent Barclay to Callao, where Porter was able to capture her before she could enter port. He sent a disarmed Nereyda back to the Peruvian authorities as a gesture of good will. He searched for Nimrod and Walker, but was unable to find them. At Valparaiso Essex landed the crew members that she had taken off Nocton.

In the next five months, Essex captured thirteen British whalers, including , (ex-Atlantic) which cruised in company with her captor; Porter put his executive officer, John Downes, in command of Essex Junior. The two ships and nine of their prizes put in at the island of Nuku Hiva in the Marquesas Islands on 25 October 1813 for repairs. While they were there, their crews became involved in a local dispute that resulted in the Nuku Hiva Campaign, which temporarily established the United States' first colony and naval base in the Pacific Ocean. Essex and Essex Junior departed Nuku Hiva in mid-December 1813.

In January 1814, Essex sailed into neutral waters at Valparaíso, only to be trapped there for six weeks by the British frigate  (36 guns), under Captain James Hillyar, and the sloop-of-war  (18 guns). On 28 March 1814, Porter determined to gain the open sea, fearing the arrival of British reinforcements. Upon rounding the point, Essex lost her main top-mast to foul weather and was brought to action just north of Valparaíso. 

Despite Porter's complaints to the US Navy on several occasions, Essex was armed almost entirely with powerful but short-range 32-pounder carronades that gave Phoebe, armed with long 18-pounders, a decisive advantage at long range. For  hours, Phoebe and Cherub bombarded Essex from long range, where Essex could only resist with her few long 12-pounders. Fires twice erupted aboard Essex, at which point about fifty men abandoned the ship and swam for shore, only half of them landing; the British saved sixteen. Eventually, the hopeless situation forced Porter to surrender. Essex had suffered 58 dead and 31 missing of her crew of 214. The British lost four men dead and seven wounded on Phoebe, and one dead and three wounded on Cherub.

The then Lieutenant William Bolton Finch was said to have served with distinction on the Essex between 1812 and 1814.

British service and fate
Because Essex was stored and provisioned for six months, and capable of sailing to Europe without "the slightest cause for alarm", Captain Hillyar placed Lieutenant C. Pearson in command of her for the voyage to England, supported by acting lieutenant Allen Francis Gardiner. Essex arrived in England in November. There, the Admiralty had her repaired and taken into the Royal Navy as HMS Essex.

The Royal Navy never fitted her for sea, but re-classed her as a 42-gun ship. She served as a troopship on 7 July 1819. She was hulked at Cork to serve as a prison ship in Ireland in October 1823, and between 1824 and 1834 served in this capacity at Kingstown. On 6 June 1837 she was sold at public auction for £1,230.

During early 21st century resurfacing work on the east pier of Dún Laoghaire harbour, Essexs permanent mooring anchor was discovered embedded in the pier.

In literature and popular culture
Herman Melville wrote about Essex in "Sketch Fifth" in The Encantadas, focusing on an incident off the Galápagos Islands with an elusive British ship.  The story was first published in 1854 in Putnam's Magazine.

Patrick O'Brian adapted the story of Essexs attack on British whalers for his novel The Far Side of the World.

The 1950 American film Tripoli is a fictionalized account of the Battle of Derne, and USS Essex is shown in it.

See also
List of ships captured in the 19th century
Bibliography of early American naval history

Notes

Citations

References
Daughan, George (013) The Shining Sea: David Porter and the Epic Voyage of the U.S.S. Essex during the War of 1812 (Basic Books). ASIN B00C4GRUMO 
 
   Available freely at this Google eBook link

External links

Essex, a scaled replica—A scaled wooden admiralty style model of the USS Essex.
Painting Capture of the U.S. Frigate Essex by his B.M. Frigate Phoebe and Sloop Cherub in the Bay of Valparaiso by George Ropes, Jr., in the collection of the Peabody Essex Museum.
Watch- and Quarter-Bills of the U.S.S. Essex, 1812 (approximate), MS 65 held by Special Collections & Archives, Nimitz Library at the United States Naval Academy

 

1799 ships
Barbary Wars American ships
Captured ships
Quasi-War ships of the United States
Sailing frigates of the United States Navy
Ships built in Salem, Massachusetts
Vessels captured from the United States Navy
War of 1812 ships of the United States
Frigates of the Royal Navy